The first series of I'm a Celebrity...Get Me Out of Here! was broadcast on ITV from 25 August to 8 September 2002. Ant & Dec presented the main show on ITV, whilst Louise Loughman hosted the spin-off show I'm a Celebrity...Get Me Out of Here! NOW! on ITV2. The winner of this series was radio DJ Tony Blackburn.

Celebrities
The show began with eight celebrity contestants. They were:

Results and elimination
 Indicates that the celebrity received the fewest votes and was eliminated immediately (no bottom two).
 Indicates that the celebrity was named as being in the bottom two.
 Indicates that the celebrity had the highest number of votes that day.

Bushtucker Trials
The contestants take part in daily trials to earn food

 The public voted for who they wanted to face the trial
 The contestants decided who did which trial
 The trial was compulsory and no-one decided who took part

Star count

Ratings 

All ratings are taken from the UK Programme Ratings website, BARB.

Series average = 7.57 million viewers.

References 

2002 British television seasons
01